Tina Bohorič ( Obrez, born 21 April 1986) is a retired Slovenian tennis player.

Obrez was born in Ljubljana. She won two singles and six doubles titles on the ITF tour in her career. On 27 February 2006, she reached her best singles ranking of world number 489. On 15 May 2006, she peaked at world number 447 in the doubles rankings. She played for the Slovenia Fed Cup team on two occasions.

Obrez made the third qualifying round at the 2008 Banka Koper Slovenia Open, losing to Maria Elena Camerin and narrowly missing out on a place in the main draw, but received a wildcard alongside Anja Prislan in the doubles draw.

ITF finals (8–7)

Singles (2–0)

Doubles (6–7)

References

External links 
 
 
 

1986 births
Living people
Sportspeople from Ljubljana
Slovenian female tennis players